Cumnor is an unincorporated community in King and Queen County, Virginia, United States.

The Mattaponi Church was listed on the National Register of Historic Places in 1973.

References

Unincorporated communities in King and Queen County, Virginia